Stephen Lee (born 25 October 1955) is an American chemist. He is the son of Tsung-Dao Lee, the winner of the 1957 Nobel Prize in Physics. He is currently a professor at Cornell University.

Education
Lee attended the International School of Geneva, Switzerland and Yale University, from which he graduated with a BA in 1978. He later received his PhD from the University of Chicago in 1985.

Career
In 1993, Lee received the MacArthur Award for his work in the field of physics and chemistry. In addition, he has received an award from the Alfred P. Sloan Foundation for his continued research. 

In 1999, Lee joined Cornell University as a professor of solid state chemistry in the chemistry and chemical biology department from the University of Michigan, where he had been associate professor of chemistry since 1993 and where he had been recognized as both a MacArthur and a Sloan fellow. He was also a visiting scientist at Cornell in 1995.

He currently continues his teaching career at Cornell, where he instructs students in (honors) general chemistry and introduction to chemistry courses. During the past 10 years, Lee has devoted his summer to helping incoming freshmen learn basic chemistry to prepare them for the academic year. This has been considered part of Lee's philanthropic work, as he teaches these summer courses probono.

His current research involves developing stronger porous solids in which all the host porous bonds are covalent in character. Lee is also researching ways to introduce cross-linkable guests (such as di-isocyanides or disilyltriflates) which will react with nucleophilic groups, leading to a fully covalent organic porous solid. He also hopes to develop a long range order in intermetallic phases: Examine noble metal alloys where unit cell dimensions range from just a few, to almost 104 Å.

Personal life
Stephen Lee was born to 1957 Nobel Prize winner in Physics Tsung-Dao Lee and Hui-Chun Jeannette Chin, who died in 1996. Lee has one brother, James Lee (born 1952), who is the dean of the School of Humanities and Social Science at the Hong Kong University of Science and Technology and chair professor of the Division of Social Science at the same university.

References

1956 births
Living people
American physical chemists
American people of Chinese descent
Yale College alumni
Cornell University faculty
MacArthur Fellows
Scientists from New York City
Sloan Research Fellows
University of Chicago alumni
University of Michigan faculty
International School of Geneva alumni
Solid state chemists